The large cuckooshrike (Coracina macei) is a species of cuckooshrike found in the Indian Subcontinent and depending on the taxonomic treatment used, Southeast Asia. The species has had a long and varied taxonomic treatment, being closely related to forms across Southeast Asia, with some authors using the name Indian cuckooshrike (which then refers only to the species that includes the forms C. m. macei of peninsular India and C. m. layardi of Sri Lanka). The species and subspecies classifications vary widely across sources and are yet to be resolved unambiguously.

Description 

Adult males have a broad and well-marked eye stripe which is pale in females. The throat and breast are grey in males and the abdomen and flanks are finely barred. Females have the throat and breast also with barring which extends further down and lacks the prominent whitish vent of the male. They are mostly insectivorous but also feed on figs and forest fruits and usually fly in small groups with a bounding flight just above the forest canopy. The Indian population has a loud call klu-eep and the birds have a characteristic habit of flicking their closed wings one after the other upon landing on a perch. The same wing movements are also used during courtship.

Taxonomy and systematics 

Several subspecies are recognized but there is considerable confusion and the taxonomy of the group is not fully resolved. The IOC classification considers the following subspecies within the species macei:
 C. m. nipalensis (Hodgson, 1836) of the Himalayas (some authors treat this as a subspecies of C. javensis)
 C. m. macei (Lesson, R, 1831) of peninsular India
 C. m. layardi (Blyth, 1866) of Sri Lanka		
 C. m. andamana (Neumann, 1915) of the Andaman Islands	
 C. m. rexpineti (Swinhoe, 1863) of southeastern China, Taiwan, Laos and Vietnam		
 C. m. larvivora (Hartert, 1910) of Hainan (off China)		
 C. m. siamensis (Baker, ECS, 1918) of Myanmar and southern China to southern Indochina		
 C. m. larutensis (Sharpe, 1887) of the Malay Peninsula (some authors treat this as a subspecies of C. javensis or as a separate species)
The species was for sometime lumped, treated as a subspecies of Coracina  novaehollandiae within the caledonica superspecies.

Breeding 
The species breeds in the dry months of winter. The nest is a shallow saucer placed in the fork of a horizontal branch at some height above the ground. The saucer is made of twigs and grass decorated on the outside with cobwebs and with little lining. The typical clutch is three eggs in peninsular India and two around Bengal.

References

large cuckooshrike
Birds of China
Birds of South Asia
Birds of Southeast Asia
large cuckooshrike
Taxa named by René Lesson